Santos may refer to:

People
Santos (surname)
Santos (DJ) (born 1971), Italian DJ
Santos Benavides (1823–1891), Confederate general in the American Civil War
Santos Balmori Picazo (1899–1992), Spanish-Mexican painter
Santos (footballer, born 1983) (Rafael dos Santos Franciscatti), Brazilian football midfielder
Aderbar Santos (Aderbar Melo dos Santos Neto), Brazilian football goalkeeper
George Santos, an American politician, elected to Congress in 2022
Rafael Santos Borré, Colombian football player

Places
Santos, São Paulo, a municipality in São Paulo, Brazil
Port of Santos, container port
Santos Basin, offshore sedimentary basin
Santos Formation
Sántos, Somogy county, Hungary
Santos Peak, Graham Land, Antarctica
Santos Trail System, a network of mountain bike trails outside Ocala, Florida
General Santos, a city in the Philippines
Dr. Santos Avenue, a major thoroughfare in Metro Manila, Philippines
Strathmore, California, formerly Santos, in Tulare County, California, U.S.

Football clubs
Santos FC (f. 1912), in Santos, Brazil
Santos FC (women) (f. 1997), in Santos, Brazil
Santos Futebol Clube (AP) (f. 1973), in Macapá, Brazil
Santos Futebol Clube (PB) (f. 1949), in João Pessoa, Brazil
Santos FC (Burkina Faso) (f. 1977), in Ouagadougou, Burkina Faso
Santos FC (Guyana), in Georgetown, Guyana
Santos F.C. (Jamaica)
Santos F.C. (South Africa) (f. 1982), in Cape Town
Santos de Guápiles F.C. (f. 1961), in Limón, Costa Rica
Santos Futebol Clube de Angola (f. 2002), in Viana, Angola
Santos Laguna or Santos (f. 1983), in Torreón, Mexico
FC Santos Tartu (f. 2006), Estonia
S.V. Santos, in Nieuw Nickerie, Suriname
Dagoretti Santos F.C., in Nairobi, Kenya
Uniao Flamengo Santos F.C., in Gaborone, Botswana

Other uses
Santos, the plural form of Santo (art)
Santos Limited, an Australian oil and gas company
Santos Stadium, now SA Athletics Stadium, Adelaide, South Australia
Santos TV, a Brazilian TV channel operated by Santos FC
TV Santos, a private regional TV station in Serbia
Santos, a character in the TV series Ugly Betty

See also

Santa (disambiguation)
Santo (disambiguation)
Santosh (disambiguation)
Los Santos (disambiguation)